Chess of the Grandmasters (original title: Schach der Großmeister) is a former German TV programme. The programme was devised, supervised and presented by Claus Spahn.

History 

Between 1983 and 2005, the programme was broadcast once a year by Germany's Westdeutscher Rundfunk (WDR) broadcasting corporation. The concept of the programme was that two Grandmasters played a game of chess against each other that was commentated and analysed by two Grandmasters, Helmut Pfleger and Vlastimil Hort, and later also analysed by the chess program Fritz. The winner received the WDR TV Chess Award and had the opportunity to defend the title against a new challenger in the following year.

The invited players included Garry Kasparov, Vladimir Kramnik, Viswanathan Anand, Peter Leko, Jan Timman and lot more. The first game was played in 1983 by Chess Worldchampion Anatoly Karpov and the strongest German player at that time, Robert Hübner. In the final broadcast in 2005, the two commentators Pfleger and Hort themselves played against each other.

In 1995, Kasparov won a two-game match (1½-½) against the Chess Genius 3 computer program. This contest attracted great attention in the media, because Kasparov had shortly before lost against this program in a Fast chess tournament in London.

Examples of games 

The most remarkable games in the series included the victory of Judit Polgár, aged just 14 at the time, against the experienced German Grandmaster Rainer Knaak in 1990, as well as the defeat of Hübner against Kasparov in just 15 moves in 1992.

Judit Polgár – Rainer Knaak, Chess of the Grandmasters 1990

1.e4 e6 2.d4 d5 3.Nc3 Bb4 4.e5 c5 5.a3 Bxc3+ 6.bxc3 Ne7 (the Winawer Variation of the French Defence, ECO code C18) 7.Qg4 Qc7 8.Bd3 cxd4 9.Ne2 Qxe5 10.Bf4 Qf6 11.Bg5 Qe5 12.cxd4 h5 13.Qh4 Qc7 14.Bf4 Qa5+ 15.Bd2 Qd8 16.g4 e5 17.dxe5 Bxg4 18.Rg1 Qd7 19.f3 Be6 20.Nd4 Nbc6 21.Nxc6 Nxc6 22.Rxg7 Qc7 23.f4 Nxe5 24.fxe5 Qxe5+ 25.Kf2 Qxg7 26.Rg1 Qb2 27.Bb4 f6 28.Re1 O-O-O 29.Rxe6 Kb8 30.Qxf6 Qa2 31.Qd4 Rc8 32.Bd2 Ka8 33.Be3 Rxc2+ 34.Bxc2 Qxc2+ 35.Ke1 Qb1+ 36.Kd2 Qa2+ 37.Kd1 Qb1+ 38.Ke2 Qc2+ 39.Bd2 Rf8 40.Qxd5 1-0

Games and results 

The tables below list games than can be played (Java Script).

TV Chess Award:

Other broadcasts:

References / Games 

 Die 25 Partien des Fernsehschachpreises und die 6 Partien der weiteren Sendungen des WDR by Gerhard Hund (in German)

External links 

 Schach der Großmeister '97 : Wladimir Kramnik - Judit Polgar, 31. August 1997 in Köln (in German)
 WDR: Schach der Großmeister '98 - Wladimir Kramnik - Michael Adams, 16. August 1998 (in German)
 WDR: Schach der Großmeister '99 - Artur Jussupow - Jörg Hickl, 15. August 1999 (in German)
 Interview mit Claus Spahn, 12. Juli 2001 anläßlich der Verleihung des Deutschen Schachpreises 2001 (in German)
 "Schach der Großmeister" im WDR-Fernsehen am 12. August 2001 in Köln (in German)
 Zur letzten Sendung Schach der Großmeister am 24. August 2005 (in German)

Chess competitions
Chess in Germany
1983 in chess
2005 in chess
1983 German television series debuts
2005 German television series endings
1990s German television series
German-language television shows
Das Erste original programming